Hazara nationalism is a movement that claims the Hazara people, an ethnic group native to the Hazaristan region of Afghanistan, are a distinct nation and deserve a nation-state of their own. The movement propagates the view that Muslims are not a nation and that ethnic loyalty must surpass religious loyalty, though this view has been challenged by both the 1890s independence uprisings of Hazaristan and the systematic discrimination many Hazaras have historically faced within Afghanistan.

Hazara ethnicity and nationalism 
Hazara nationalism stems from lingual and ancestral roots in the Hazaristan region in the modern-day central Afghanistan.

The movement claims to receive considerable support from the Hazara diaspora in Australia, United Kingdom, Sweden, Norway, United States, Canada and other countries. Successive Pashtun-dominated Afghan governments have repeatedly made claims that the Hazara nationalists have received funding from Iran, despite the fact that the Hazara nationalists are against the Iranian regime, and have criticized the theocratic regime on many occasions for discrimination against the Hazara people in Iran. According to them, these accusations are the usual propaganda tactic that the Pashtun-dominated governments use against the Hazara people.

Modern Hazara nationalism 
Hazara nationalism in its modern form began in the form of the 1888–1893 Hazara uprisings and 1890s (Organisation for Unity of the Hazara) based in Hazaristan, led by Hazara elders and allies. The aim of the group was to establish political and constitutional reform in the Hazaristan region; and an end to the military despotism of Abdur Rahman of the Barakzai dynasty for the eventual unification of all Hazara lands into an independent state. In 1985, simultaneously with the formation of the Hezbe Wahdat, Hazara intellectuals in Mazare Sharif, formed a nationalist organisation, called the Hazara Unity.

There was a revival of Hazara nationalism after the Balkhab uprising, led by Mehdi Mujahid in 2022. In his own words, Mehdi left the Taliban and began rebelling as a result of persecution of Shia Muslims and Hazaras.

Hazara nationalists 
 Mir Yazdanbakhsh
 Ibrahim Gawsawar
 General Musa Khan
 Sultan Ali Keshtmand
 Abdul Ali Mazari
 Sarwar Sarkhosh
 Dawood Sarkhosh
 Aziz Royesh
 Daoud Naji
 Abbas Noyan
 Ahmad Behzad
 Mehdi Mujahid

References 

Hazara history
Hazaragi culture
Nationalism in Afghanistan
Nationalisms
Nationalist movements in Asia